Sibara virginica is a species of flowering plant in the family Brassicaceae known by the common name Virginia winged rockcress. It is native to North America, where it can be found throughout the southeastern quadrant of the United States and in California and Baja California in the west. It grows in many types of habitat, including disturbed areas. It is an annual or biennial herb producing a basal rosette of leaves with comblike blades so deeply divided into many lobes that they may appear to have leaflets. It bolts one or more erect stems up to 30 centimeters tall. The flowers each have four spoon-shaped white petals a few millimeters long and purplish sepals. The fruit is a flattened, elongated silique up to 2.5 centimeters long containing tiny seeds.

References

External links
Jepson Manual Treatment
USDA Plants Profile
Missouri Plants
Illinois Wildflowers

Brassicaceae
Plants described in 1753
Taxa named by Carl Linnaeus